Bay City Town Center (formerly Bay City Mall until 2017) is an enclosed shopping mall in Bangor Township, Bay County, Michigan, just outside the city of Bay City, Michigan, United States. Opened in 1991, the mall features Dunham's Sports, Marshalls, Ollie's Bargain Outlet, and PetSmart, with vacancies previously occupied by Younkers, JCPenney, and Target. The mall also features a 10-screen movie theater owned by Goodrich Quality Theaters. It is managed by a partnership of Lormax Stern. It is the second mall in Bay County, Michigan, the first being the defunct Hampton Square Mall.

History

Target opened in 1990, and the rest of the mall, including Sears and an H. C. Prange Co. department store (bought out by Younkers in 1992), opened the next year. It was developed by Homart Development, a retail arm of Sears, who sold most of its retail properties to General Growth Properties in 1995. In 2005, the mall received media attention when Bryan Johnson, who was costumed as the Easter Bunny during an Easter event at the mall, was attacked by a 12-year-old customer.

Old Navy opened a store at the mall in 2007. Several tenants at Bay City Mall closed in the first decade of the 21st century, including a B. Dalton bookstore and a classroom maintained by Bay-Arenac Intermediate School District, which had been at the mall since 1995. A Ruby Tuesday restaurant across from the mall also closed in 2009. These closures led to rumors that further stores, or the mall itself, might close. In 2010, the mall owners at the time, General Growth Properties, listed Bay City Mall among its least profitable malls, and announced plans to place it and eleven other malls under management of a new company.  In February 2010, ownership of the mall was turned over to a trust of unidentified lenders, who hired Cushman & Wakefield Inc. to oversee the mall. These new owners have planned a $200,000 renovation of the mall property, including a new sign on Wilder Road. Old Navy closed in mid-2012. Planet Fitness opened in October of the same year.

Cushman & Wakefield sold the mall in April 2013 to Bay City Mall Partners LLC, which is a partnership of Lormax Stern and Wayzata Investment.  Marshalls and rue21 both joined in late 2013. The movie theater complex was expanded in 2014, adding two new auditoriums with stadium seating for a total of ten screens.

Sears announced that the closure of its store at Bay City Mall store would begin on October 31, 2014. Sears has operated a store in Bay City since at least 1928. Target announced one month later that its store at Bay City Mall would close in 2015.

In 2016, Younkers announced the opening of a home and furniture store in half of the former Sears. Mall owners announced in May 2017 that the mall's food court would be removed for a PetSmart, while Ollie's Bargain Outlet would open in the other half of the vacated Sears. The mall was renamed from Bay City Mall to Bay City Town Center in August 2017.

On August 18, 2018, it was announced a farming supply store called Big R (now known as Stock + Field) would be replacing the former Target. However, these plans were canceled. Later in the month, both Younkers stores closed due to Bon-Ton Stores filing for bankruptcy. Dunham's Sports, which operated a store in the Target wing, moved to the former Younkers Furniture location in September 2019.

On June 23, 2020, JCPenney announced that it would be closing as part of a plan to close 13 stores nationwide. The store closed in October 2020.

References

External links
Bay City Town Center

Shopping malls in Michigan
Bay City, Michigan
Shopping malls established in 1991
Buildings and structures in Bay County, Michigan
1991 establishments in Michigan